Braunschweiggasse  is a station on  of the Vienna U-Bahn. It is located in the Hietzing District.

History

Braunschweiggasse (lit. Brunswick alley) got its name from William, Duke of Brunswick (Braunschweig is Brunswick in German.)

The station was built for the Wientallinie of the Viennese Metropolitan Railway (Stadtbahn), which ran between the stations Hütteldorf and Meidling Hauptstraße in 1898. In 1925, the Stadtbahn switched from steam power to electric power. The old architecture, based on Otto Wagner's style, was lost in a strategic bombing raid on the 21st of February 1945. Although the Stadtbahn was reopened on the 25th of July 1945, the station was not reopened until the 28th of November 1948. From 1979 to 1984, the station was renovated again into what it looks like today.

References

External links 
 

Buildings and structures in Hietzing
Railway stations opened in 1981
1981 establishments in Austria
Vienna U-Bahn stations
Railway stations in Austria opened in the 20th century